A dust collection system is an air quality improvement system used in industrial, commercial, and home production shops to improve breathable air quality and safety by removing particulate matter from the air and environment. Dust collection systems work on the basic formula of capture, convey and collect.

First, the dust must be captured or extracted. This is accomplished with devices such as capture hoods to catch dust at its source of origin. Many times, the machine producing the dust will have a port to which a duct can be directly attached.

Second, the dust must be conveyed. This is done via a ducting system, properly sized and manifolded to maintain a consistent minimum air velocity required to keep the dust in suspension for conveyance to the collection device. A duct of the wrong size can lead to material settling in the duct system and clogging it.

Finally, the dust is collected. This is done via a variety of means, depending on the application and the dust being handled. It can be as simple as a basic pass-through filter, a cyclonic separator, or an impingement baffle. It can also be as complex as an electrostatic precipitator, a multistage baghouse, or a chemically treated wet scrubber or stripping tower.

Types of systems 
Smaller dust collection systems use a single-stage vacuum unit to create suction and perform air filtration, where the waste material is drawn into an impeller and deposited into a container such as a bag, barrel, or canister. Air is recirculated into the shop after passing through a filter to trap smaller particulate.

Larger systems utilize a two-stage system, which separates larger particles from fine dust using a pre-collection device, such as a cyclone or baffled canister, before drawing the air through the impeller. Air from these units can then be exhausted outdoors or filtered and recirculated back into the work space.

Dust collection systems are often part of a larger air quality management program that also includes large airborne particle filtration units mounted to the ceiling of shop spaces and mask systems to be worn by workers. Air filtration units are designed to process large volumes of air to remove fine particles (2 to 10 micrometres) suspended in the air. Masks are available in a variety of forms, from simple cotton face masks to elaborate respirators with tanked air — the need for which is determined by the environment in which the worker is operating.

In industry, round or rectangular ducts are used to prevent buildup of dust in processing equipment.

Dangers of neglect 
Proper dust collection and air filtration is important in any work space. Repeated exposure to wood dust can cause chronic bronchitis, emphysema, "flu-like" symptoms, and cancer. Wood dust also frequently contains chemicals and fungi, which can become airborne and lodge deeply in the lungs, causing illness and damage.

References

External links 
 Center for Disease Control's National Institute for Health and Safety (CDC-NIOSH) – (U.S.)
 Rod Cole article, "Grounding PVC and Other Dust Collection Myths - (U.S.)

Particulate control
Waste treatment technology
Woodworking
Solid-gas separation